This is a list of presidents of the Institution of Electrical Engineers from its formation in 1871 until 2005, the date of amalgamation with the Institution of Incorporated Engineers to form the Institution of Engineering and Technology. Prior to 1889 the Institution was known as the Society of Telegraph Engineers and Electricians.

List of presidents
Source: IET Archives

1871–1899

1900–1999

2000–2005
2000	Professor John Edwin Midwinter FREng FRS
2001	Professor Brian Mellitt FREng DIC
2002	Professor Michael John Howard Sterling FREng
2003	Sir David Brown FREng CEng BSc DMS
2004	Professor John O'Reilly FREng
2005	Sir John Chisholm FREng CEng (last president)

For presidents from 2005–present, see Presidents of the Institution of Engineering and Technology

 
Lists of presidents of organizations
Presidents of learned societies
Lists of engineers